The 2015–16 UEFA Women's Champions League was the 15th edition of the European women's club football championship organised by UEFA, and the 7th edition since being rebranded as the UEFA Women's Champions League.

The final was played at the Mapei Stadium – Città del Tricolore in Reggio Emilia, Italy on 26 May 2016, two days before the final of the men's tournament played at San Siro, Milan.

Lyon defeated Wolfsburg 4–3 on penalties (1–1 after extra time) to win their third European title. Frankfurt were the defending champions, but were eliminated by Wolfsburg in the semi-finals.

Association team allocation
A total of 56 teams from 47 of the 54 UEFA member associations participated in the 2015–16 UEFA Women's Champions League. The ranking based on the UEFA Women's Champions League association coefficient was used to determine the number of participating teams for each association:
Associations 1–8 each had two teams qualify.
All other associations, should they enter, each had one team qualify.
The winners of the 2014–15 UEFA Women's Champions League were given an additional entry if they do not qualify for the 2015–16 UEFA Women's Champions League through their domestic league. Because Frankfurt finished outside the top two league places, this additional entry was necessary, meaning Germany had three teams in the competition this season.

Association ranking
For the 2015–16 UEFA Women's Champions League, the associations were allocated places according to their 2014 UEFA Women's Champions League association coefficient, which took into account their performance in European competitions from 2009–10 to 2013–14.

Spain overtook the Czech Republic in the UEFA coefficient ranking and thus assured themselves a second entry.

Notes
 – Additional berth for title holders
 – Did not enter
 – No rank (association did not enter in the five seasons used for computing coefficients)

Teams
Unlike the men's Champions League, not every association enters a team, and so the exact number of teams in each round can not be determined until the full entry list is known. For this season, the title holders, the champions and runners-up from associations 1–8 and the champions from associations 9–15 entered the round of 32, while the remaining teams entered the qualifying round.

The following list the teams that qualified and enter this season's competition. Here TH denotes the title holders, CH denotes the national champion, RU the national runner-up, Ned 1 and Bel 1 the best placed Belgian and Dutch team in their joint league. Gibraltar's champions were still ineligible, as the 2014–15 national league season was again played with only nine players per side. After some years of hiatus Georgia played out a national champion in 2014. For the first time in 12 years Neulengbach from Austria missed out on qualification. Luxembourg entered a team for the competition for the first time since the 2011–12 season. Faroese club KÍ had entered every past edition.

Round and draw dates
The schedule of the competition was as follows (all draws were held at the UEFA headquarters in Nyon, Switzerland). In contrast to previous seasons, the round of 16 draw was held after the round of 32 was completed (separately from the round of 32 draw) and was seeded. Moreover, the quarter-finals were now moved back to be played in midweek, with only the semi-finals played on weekends.

Qualifying round

The draw for the qualifying round was held on 25 June 2015. The 32 teams were allocated into four seeding positions based on their 2015 UEFA club coefficients, which took into account their performance in European competitions from 2010–11 to 2014–15 plus 33% of their association coefficient from the same time span. They were drawn into eight groups of four (one from each seeding position), with the restriction that each group had to contain one of the eight teams which were pre-selected as hosts (which were allocated their own designated pot).

In each group, teams played against each other in a round-robin mini-tournament at the pre-selected hosts. The eight group winners advanced to the round of 32. The matchdays were 11, 13 and 16 August 2015.

Group 1

Group 2

Group 3

Group 4

Group 5

Group 6

Group 7

Group 8

Knockout phase

In the knockout phase, teams played against each other over two legs on a home-and-away basis, except for the one-match final. The mechanism of the draws for each round was as follows:
In the draw for the round of 32, the sixteen teams with the highest UEFA coefficients were seeded (with the title holders being the automatic top seed), and the other sixteen teams were unseeded. The seeded teams were drawn against the unseeded teams, with the seeded teams hosting the second leg. Teams from the same association could not be drawn against each other.
In the draw for the round of 16, the eight teams with the highest UEFA coefficients were seeded (with the title holders being the automatic top seed should they qualify), and the other eight teams were unseeded. The seeded teams were drawn against the unseeded teams, with the seeded teams hosting the second leg. Teams from the same association could not be drawn against each other.
In the draws for the quarter-finals onwards, there were no seedings, and teams from the same association could be drawn against each other.

Bracket

Round of 32
The draw for the round of 32 was held on 20 August 2015. The first legs were played on 7 and 8 October, and the second legs were played on 14 and 15 October 2015.

Round of 16
The draw for the round of 16 was held on 19 October 2015. The first legs were played on 11 and 12 November, and the second legs were played on 18 and 19 November 2015.

Quarter-finals
The draws for the quarter-finals and semi-finals were held on 27 November 2015. The first legs were played on 23 March, and the second legs were played on 30 March 2016.

Semi-finals
The first legs were played on 24 April, and the second legs were played on 1 and 2 May 2016.

Final

The final was played on 26 May 2016 at the Mapei Stadium – Città del Tricolore in Reggio Emilia, Italy. The "home" team (for administrative purposes) was determined by an additional draw held after the quarter-final and semi-final draws.

Statistics
Statistics include qualifying rounds.

Top goalscorers

Top assists

Squad of the season
The UEFA technical study group selected the following 18 players as the squad of the tournament:

See also
2015–16 UEFA Champions League

References

External links
2015–16 UEFA Women's Champions League
European league standings

 
2015-16
Women's Champions League
2015 in women's association football
2016 in women's association football